Jean-Didier François Charles Blanchet (born 2 December 1939) is a French business executive, and a former Chief Executive of Air France.

Early life
He attended the École Polytechnique in 1959.

Career

Government

From 1969 to 1972, he worked for the DGAC (Direction générale de l'Aviation civile, then known as the Secrétariat Générale de l'Aviation Civile), the French civil aviation authority. From 1972 to 1973 he worked for RATP (Régie autonome des transports parisiens).

From 2002 to 2008 he worked for the Ministry of Ecology and Sustainable Development (Ministère de l'Ecologie, du Développement durable), in the CGEDD (Conseil général de l'environnement et du développement durable). Since 2006 he has worked with the French division of CARE (relief agency) (Cooperative for American Remittances to Europe).

Air France
He joined Air France in 1977.

From March 1988 to November 1993 he was Chief Executive (Directeur général) of Air France.

Le Méridien
From 1993 to 1996 he worked for Le Méridien as Chairman, the worldwide hotel chain owned by Air France.

See also
 Bernard Attali, Chairman of Air France from 1988 to 1993

References

External links
 Dix ans d'exploitation commercial de Concorde (document)

1939 births
French airline chief executives
École Polytechnique alumni
French chief executives
Hospitality industry in France
Living people